The 1912 North Carolina A&M Aggies football team represented North Carolina College of Agriculture and Mechanic Arts—now known as North Carolina State University—as a member of the South Atlantic Intercollegiate Athletic Association] during the 1912 college football season. It was the inaugural season of play for the SAIAA. Led by fourth-year head coach Edward L. Greene, the Aggies compiled an overall record of 4–3 with a mark of 0–2 in conference play.

Schedule

References

North Carolina AandM
NC State Wolfpack football seasons
North Carolina AandM Aggies football